Commercial Historic District or Commercial District may refer to:

Paris Commercial Historic District (Paris, Arkansas), listed on the NRHP in Arkansas
Commercial Historic District (Potlatch, Idaho), listed on the NRHP in Idaho
Commercial Historic District (Pikeville, Kentucky), listed on the NRHP in Kentucky
Commercial Community Historic District, Lexington, Missouri, listed on the NRHP in Missouri
Commercial District (Hardin, Montana), listed on the NRHP in Montana
Commercial District (Livingston, Montana), listed on the NRHP in Montana

See also
Downtown Commercial Historic District (disambiguation)
Commercial Street Historic District (disambiguation)